is a former badminton player from Japan. He is the son of former badminton player Yoshiko Yonekura. In 2010, he reached the final of the All England Open Badminton Championships. En route to the final he beat three seeded players including Nguyen Tien Minh, Chen Jin and Bao Chunlai. In the final, Tago lost to the first seed and reigning World No. 1 Lee Chong Wei from Malaysia with a score of 21–19 and 21–19, following an incorrect line call in Lee Chong Wei's favour at matchpoint. In 2012, he competed at the London 2012 Summer Olympics in the men's singles event, but did not advance to the knock-out stage after being defeated by Niluka Karunaratne of Sri Lanka with a score of 18–21, 16–21. In 2014, he reached the Indonesia Open final after a shocking win over Lee Chong Wei in the semifinal but could not keep up his good form and went on to lose by straight games in the final to Jan O. Jorgensen of Denmark. He competed at the 2010 and 2014 Asian Games.

Achievements

Asian Championships 
Men's singles

BWF World Junior Championships 
Boys' singles

Asian Junior Championships 
Boys' singles

BWF Superseries 
The BWF Superseries, launched on 14 December 2006 and implemented in 2007, was a series of elite badminton tournaments, sanctioned by Badminton World Federation (BWF). BWF Superseries had two level such as Superseries and Superseries Premier. A season of Superseries featured twelve tournaments around the world, which introduced since 2011, with successful players invited to the Superseries Finals held at the year end.

Men's singles

  BWF Superseries Finals tournament
  BWF Superseries Premier tournament
  BWF Superseries tournament

BWF International Challenge/Series 
Men's singles

  BWF International Challenge tournament
  BWF International Series tournament

Record against selected opponents 
Includes results against Olympic quarterfinals, Worlds semifinalists, and Super Series finalists, as well as all Olympic opponents.

  Chen Jin 2–3
  Chen Yu 1–1
  Chen Long 4–7
  Bao Chunlai 2–0
  Lin Dan 1–3
  Wang Zhengming 1–3
  Du Pengyu 2–2
  Hsieh Yu-hsing 1–0
  Jan Ø. Jørgensen 7–7
  Joachim Persson 2–0
  Peter Gade 1–3
  Viktor Axelsen 2–2
  Marc Zwiebler 5–0
  Hu Yun 6–2
  Parupalli Kashyap 3–2
  Srikanth Kidambi 2–0
  Simon Santoso 2–2
  Sony Dwi Kuncoro 1–7
  Taufik Hidayat 2–4
  Tommy Sugiarto 1–3
  Sho Sasaki 3–2
  Shon Seung-mo 0–2
  Lee Hyun-il 0–1
  Park Sung-hwan 0–3
  Park Tae-sang 0–1
  Shon Wan-ho 2–3
  Lee Chong Wei 2–17
  Liew Daren 2–0
  Wong Choong Hann 1–4
  Chong Wei Feng 5–1
  Ronald Susilo 1–0
  Niluka Karunaratne 0–1
  Boonsak Ponsana 2–1
  Nguyen Tien Minh 2–1

Gambling scandal 
In October 2015, Kenichi Tago was kicked out of Japan's national team by Park Joo-bong because of indiscipline, after he repeatedly missed training sessions and was proving to be a bad influence to other players. On 8 April 2016, Tago admitted to squandering 10 million Japanese yen over a period of 2 years after making over 60 visits to illegal casinos. Gambling in Japan is illegal, with frequent gambling punishable with imprisonment of up to 3 years.

References

External links 

 
 Profile on Badspi.jp 
 Profile on Smash-net.tv 

1989 births
Living people
Sportspeople from Saitama Prefecture
Japanese male badminton players
Badminton players at the 2012 Summer Olympics
Olympic badminton players of Japan
Badminton players at the 2010 Asian Games
Badminton players at the 2014 Asian Games
Asian Games competitors for Japan
21st-century Japanese people